The Rad am Ring is a cycle racing festival held annually at the Nürburgring in Germany since 2003. It features road cycling and mountain bike races, including 24-hour races for each, and a cycling exposition.

Since 2016 it features a professional road race, also known in 2016 as the Rudi Altig Race, named after German cyclist Rudi Altig who won his Road Race World Championship at the Nürburgring and died shortly before the race. The first two editions were a 1.1 event on the UCI Europe Tour; since 2018 it is part of the German Bundesliga.

Winners

References

External links
 Official website

UCI Europe Tour races
Cycle races in Germany
Sport in Rhineland-Palatinate
2016 establishments in Germany
Recurring sporting events established in 2016